oneAPI is an open standard for a unified application programming interface intended to be used across different compute accelerator (coprocessor) architectures, including GPUs, AI accelerators and field-programmable gate arrays. It is intended to eliminate the need for developers to maintain separate code bases, multiple programming languages, and different tools and workflows for each architecture.

The oneAPI specification 
The oneAPI specification extends existing developer programming models to enable multiple hardware architectures through a data-parallel language, a set of library APIs, and a low-level hardware interface to support cross-architecture programming. It builds upon industry standards and provides an open, cross-platform developer stack.

Data Parallel C++ 
DPC++ is an open, cross-architecture language built upon the ISO C++ and Khronos Group SYCL standards. DPC++ is an implementation of SYCL with extensions that are proposed for inclusion in future revisions of the SYCL standard. An example of this is the contribution of unified shared memory, group algorithms and sub-groups to SYCL 2020.

oneAPI libraries 
The set of APIs spans several domains that benefit from acceleration, including libraries for linear algebra math, deep learning, machine learning, video processing, and others.

The source code of most implementations of the above libraries is available on GitHub.

The oneAPI documentation also lists the "Level Zero" API defining the low-level direct-to-metal interfaces and a set or ray tracing components with its own APIs.

Hardware abstraction layer 
oneAPI Level Zero, the low-level hardware interface, defines a set of capabilities and services that a hardware accelerator needs to interface with compiler runtimes and other developer tools.

Implementations 
Intel has released production quality oneAPI toolkits that implement the specification and add CUDA code migration, analysis, and debug tools. These include the Intel oneAPI DPC++/C++ Compiler, Intel Fortran Compiler, Intel VTune Profiler and multiple performance libraries.

Codeplay has released an open-source layer to allow oneAPI and SYCL/DPC++ to run atop Nvidia GPUs via CUDA.

University of Heidelberg has developed a SYCL/DPC++ implementation for both AMD and Nvidia GPUs.

Huawei released a DPC++ compiler for their Ascend AI Chipset

Fujitsu has created an open-source ARM version of the oneAPI Deep Neural Network Library (oneDNN) for their Fugaku CPU.

References

External links 
 
 Intel oneAPI Product
 Bringing Nvidia GPU support to SYCL developers
 
 

Application programming interfaces
Cross-platform software